Graham Dunstan Martin (Leeds, United Kingdom, 21 October 1932 - 27 March 2021) was a British author, translator,  and philologist.

Bibliography

Fiction 

Giftwish (Drew, 1978) 
Catchfire (Drew, 1981) 
The Soul Master (Unwin, 1984) 
Time-Slip (Unwin, 1986) 
The Dream Wall (Unwin Hyman, 1987) 
Half a Glass of Moonshine (Unwin Hyman, 1988)

Non fiction
Shadows in the Cave: Mapping the Conscious Universe (London: Penguin Arkana, 1990) 
An Inquiry into the Purposes of Speculative Fiction – Fantasy and Truth (Lewiston, New York: The Edwin Mellen Press, 2003) 
Living On Purpose: Meaning, Intention and Value (Floris, 2008) 
Does It Matter?: The Unsustainable World of the Materialists. Edinburgh: Floris, 2005. 
Language Truth and Poetry : Notes Towards a Philosophy of Literature. Edinburgh: Edinburgh University Press, 1975. 
The Architecture of Experience: A Discussion of the Role of Language and Literature in the Construction of the World. Edinburgh: At the University Press, 1981.

Edited 

Anthology of Contemporary French Poetry. Austin: University of Texas Press, 1975.

Translated 

Paul Valéry. The Graveyard by the Sea.  Edinburgh: Edinburgh University Press, 1971. 
Louise Labé, pseud. Charly van Louise , Sonnets. With  Introduction and Commentaries by Peter Sharratt. Edinburgh: Edinburgh University Press, 1974. 
Jules Laforgue,  Selected Poems. London, England: Penguin Books, 1998.

References 

1932 births
2021 deaths
20th-century British translators
21st-century English male writers
20th-century English male writers
British philologists
Writers from Leeds
French–English translators